Yusuf Ismail Ali is a Somali jurist and lawyer who served as the Chief Justice of Somaliland from June 2011 until April 2015.

See also

 Ministry of Justice (Somaliland)
 Judiciary of Somaliland
 Supreme Court of Somaliland

References

Living people
Chief justices of Somaliland
Somaliland jurists
Year of birth missing (living people)